Erskine Butterfield (February 9, 1913 – July 11, 1961) was an American pianist, singer, bandleader and composer, active in the 1930s to the 1950s, and best known for his boogie-woogie and swing piano style. Butterfield was credited with "helping to invent the style of 'cocktail piano.

Biography
Born in Syracuse, New York, Butterfield played piano at an early age when his family moved to Newark, New Jersey, where he later studied piano. In the 1930s, he regularly appeared on radio, including WOR in New York City, and played with Noble Sissle's orchestra. He made his first sound recording and reproduction in 1937 on the Variety record label. In 1938, he signed with Decca Records, for which he recorded over forty titles between 1940 and 1942, many of which were released. Butterfield was called the "Singing Vagabond of the Keys" by the Chicago Defender in 1939. He "was innovative in utilizing black and white musicians together in his combo", which included session musicians such as Jimmy Lytell (clarinet), Carmen Mastren (guitar), and Haig Stevens (bass).

In 1939, Butterfield signed with Joe Davis of Beacon Records, with whom he would maintain a long-term relationship. In 1943, Butterfield was drafted, but continued to play in a group including such musicians as Slim Furness (guitar), Eugene Brooks (drums) and Lynwood Jones (upright bass), and he cut V-Discs in 1945. In 1944, he recorded eight titles for Joe Davis under the name Erskine Butterfield and his Blue Boys.

Butterfield's "light swing and traditional piano phrases" resulted in some of his songs, such as "Lovin' Man" and "Because Of You," being used in film soundtracks.

After World War II, Butterfield formed a trio and toured extensively, but his music style was less successful commercially. He recorded for a number of small labels in the late 1940s, after which his recording activity dropped off. In 1956, however, he again recorded a number of titles for Joe Davis with a reformed group, Butterfield and his Blue Boys, including musicians such as Sam "The Man" Taylor (saxophone) and Panama Francis (drums).

Butterfield made appearances on The Nat King Cole Show, The Tony Martin Program and The Jo Stafford Show.

He died on July 11, 1961, in New York City.

Partial discography

78s

Decca Records

Popular series
Tuxedo Junction b/w Salt Butter No. 3042A&B Feb. 21, 1940
Darn that Dream b/w Inconvenience No. 3043A&B Feb. 21, 1940
Your Feet's Too Big b/w What's Cooking No. 3209A&B May 27, 1940
The Down Home Blues b/w Nothin' to Do No. 3252A&B May 3, 1940
Boogie Woogie St. Louis Blues b/w Chocolate No. 3356A&B Aug. 9, 1940
Pushin' the Conversation Along b/w Don't Leave Me Now No. 3357A&B Aug. 9, 1940
Sleepy Town Train b/w You Made Me Care No. 4360A&B July 23, 1942
Birmingham Special b/w Jumpin' in the Julep Joint No. 4400A&B July 23, 1942

Sepia series
Beale Street Mama b/w Whatcha Know, Joe? No. 8510 Nov. 15, 1940
Jivin' the Missouri Waltz b/w Stayin' at Home No. 8524A&B Nov. 15, 1940
Paradiddle Joe b/w All the Time No. 8539 Feb. 28, 1941
Blackberry Jam b/w Monday's Wash No. 8543 Feb. 28, 1941
Because of You b/w You Might have Belonged to Another No. 8551A&B Apr. 29, 1941
I Dreamt I Dwelt in Harlem b/w Jelly, Jelly No. 8552 Apr. 29, 1941
Foo-Gee b/w You Should Live So Long No. 8569A&B July 24, 1941
You Done Lost Your Good Thing Now b/w Cheatin' on Me No. 8576A&B July 24, 1941
I was a Fool to Let You Go b/w Honey Dear No. 8588 Oct. 23, 1941
If Money Grew on Trees b/w Mama Long and Tall No. 8596 Oct. 23, 1941
The Devil Sat Down and Cried b/w Boogie De Concerto No. 8600 Jan. 13, 1942
Lovin' Man b/w Crazy Blues No. 8620 Jan. 13, 1942

Vinyl
Erskine Butterfield and his Blue Boys, Tuesday at Ten. Probably recorded in 1941 by World Broadcasting, Inc., for radio broadcast, and released on vinyl in 1983 by Circle Records, No CLP-62. (Music written by Butterfield is indicated by his name in parenthesis following the title.)
Tuesday at Ten
A Zoot Suit (Butterfield)
Blackberry Jam (Butterfield)
Something's Bound to Happen
Lighthouse (Butterfield)
Monday's Wash (Butterfield)
J.P. Dooley, III
The Boogie Beat'll Get You
Flying Home
You Should Live So Long
1944-1956/Part-Time Boogie. Eight titles recorded at WOR Studios, New York, on August 17, 1944, and 10 titles recorded at Mastertone Studios, New York, on June 13, 1956, but released in 1957. Harlequin Records, 1986, No. HQ 2050. All are original Butterfield compositions.
(1944)
Lighthouse
Part Time Boogie
Saturday Night Twist
Piano Cocktail
Boogie Woogie Barcarolle
Fantasy in Blue
Six-Thirty Express
Dream Time

(1956)
Blackberry Jam
Light-House
Part-Time Boogie
Piano Cocktail
Saturday Nite Twist
Chocolate
Monday's Wash (Butterfield's theme song on WOR radio)
Six-Thirty Express
Piano Time
Movin' Along

References

Other sources
Bruce Bastin, Sleeve notes for Erskine Butterfield, 1944-1957/Part-Time Boogie (including unsigned sleeve notes from 1957 album Piano Cocktail). Harlequin HQ 2050 (1986). 
Frank Driggs, Sleeve notes to Erskine Butterfield and His Blue Boys, Tuesday at Ten, Circle Records, 1983. 
The Online Discographical Project
 Sharon A. Pease, "Erskine Butterfield Is Jack of All Trades", Down Beat, VIII (Dec. 1, 1941), 16.

1913 births
1961 deaths
Musicians from Syracuse, New York
African-American jazz musicians
American blues pianists
American male pianists
American blues singer-songwriters
American music arrangers
New York blues musicians
Decca Records artists
Boogie-woogie pianists
Swing bandleaders
Swing pianists
Swing composers
Musicians from Newark, New Jersey
Singers from New York City
20th-century African-American male singers
Singer-songwriters from New Jersey
20th-century American pianists
Jazz musicians from New York (state)
Male jazz composers
20th-century jazz composers
African-American songwriters
African-American pianists
20th-century African-American musicians
American male singer-songwriters
Singer-songwriters from New York (state)